Capital is a  department of Catamarca Province in Argentina.

Districts

Bajo Hondo
El Calvario
El Carrizal
El Pantanillo
La Aguada
La Calera
La Sombrilla
La Viñita
Loma Cortada
Pto. Fernández
San Fernando del Valle de Catamarca

References

External links
Capital webpage (Spanish)
 San Fernando de Valle Website (Spanish)

Departments of Catamarca Province